This is a list of cricket players who have played representative cricket for Wayamba in Sri Lanka. Wayamba has also played as North Western Province.

It includes players that have played at least one match, in senior First-Class, List A cricket, or Twenty20 matches. Practice matches are not included, unless they have officially been classified at First-class tour matches.

The Inter-Provincial Cricket Tournament is the premier domestic cricket competition in Sri Lanka. It was founded in 1990.

First Class Players
All of the cricket players who have represented Wayamba in first class cricket in order of their appearance for the team:

List 'A' Players
All of the Players who have represented Wayamba in List A cricket domestic one day competitions:

Twenty20 Players
All of the Players who have represented Wayamba in Twenty20 domestic competitions:

External links
Players Who Have Played For North Western Province
Players Who Have Played For Wayamba
Sri Lanka Cricket

Wayamba cricketers
Wayamba